¿Dónde Jugarán las Niñas? is the first studio album by Mexican rock band Molotov, released in 1997 by Surco Records. The album's title, literally "Where Will The Girls Play?", is a pun on Maná's ¿Dónde Jugarán los Niños? and is also intended as a sexual double-entendre underpinned by the risqué cover featuring a young woman's legs seductively displayed in school uniform.

The album's opening track, "Que no te haga bobo Jacobo", refers to Jacobo Zabludovsky, newscaster of Televisa who is portrayed in the song as being biased and unreliable.

Track listing

Sales and certifications

References

Molotov (band) albums
1997 debut albums
Universal Music Latino albums
Spanish-language albums
Albums produced by Gustavo Santaolalla